Beginning in the latter half of the 19th century, the Nizamiye Courts (also written Nizami) were a secular court system introduced within the Ottoman Empire during the Tanzimat era. This court system was administered under the Ottoman Ministry of Justice. Although secular, the Mecelle (the Ottoman version of codified Sharia) was eventually applied to the courts. This court system drew much influence from French models at the time. These courts enabled the further growth of legal pluralism within Ottoman jurisprudence.

History

From 1839 onwards various legal changes were implemented in the Ottoman Empire with heavy French influence. For example, the penal code (in Turkish ceza kannunamesi) from 1840 was revised in 1851 and later replaced by a French legal code. The French legal code also determined the Ottoman legal codes of commerce (1950) and maritime commerce (1863). By the 1860s, secular Nizamiye Courts were introduced in order to enact this new form of legal practice. The Nizamiye Courts were first established in 1864 as a part of the extensive Tanzimat efforts meant to Westernize and modernize the Ottoman Empire. During this time period the Khedivial Law School was founded for the sake of training lawyers for the Nizamiye Courts.

Middle East historian William L. Cleveland writes,

“The new penal laws were a continuation of the work of the jurist, religious scholar, and civil functionary, Ahmed Cevdet Pasha. In a series of reforms, Cevdet Pasha arranged for the establishment of secular, or Nizami  courts with their own judiciary and courts of appeal.”

Out of this court system rose a duality within Ottoman legal practice. The Sharia Courts and Nizamiye Courts coexisted creating legal pluralism within the Empire. In some ways, this led to the slippery slope of increasing a lawyer's ability to choose within the legal sphere leading to corruption. 

With regards to this pluralism, law professor Lee Epstein states that,

"In an attempt to clarify the division of judicial competences, an administrative council laid down that religious matters were to be handled by religious courts, and statute matters were to be handled by the Nizamiye courts."

Structure of Nizamiye Courts

The court was based from French models and were European in style. Therefore, they contained a three-tier hierarchal arrangement. This system was extended to the local magistrate level with the final promulgation of the Mecelle, a civil code that regulated marriage, divorce, alimony, will, and other matters of personal status.

The three levels:

1st: Instance courts

2nd: Courts of appeals

3rd: A cassation court located in Istanbul, dealing with commercial, criminal and civil cases.

See also

Ottoman Empire
Tanzimat
Mecelle
Sharia
Secularism
Legal pluralism

References

Courts in Turkey
Ottoman law